Speranza is the Italian word for hope.  It could refer to one of several things:

People
 Alessandro Speranza, an Italian composer
 Giovanni Speranza, an Italian soccer player
 Guy Speranza, a US singer with the band Riot
 M. Grazia Speranza, Italian applied mathematician and operations researcher
 Norma Jean Speranza, the birth name of US pop singer Jill Corey
 Sandro Finocchio Speranza, the birth name of Sandro Finoglio, a Venezuelan TV show host
 A pseudonym used by the Irish poet Jane Wilde

Films
 Il viale della speranza, a 1953 Italian drama film directed by Dino Risi
 La grande speranza, a 1954 anti-war film
 Due soldi di speranza, a 1952 film directed by Renato Castellani
 Il Cammino della speranza, a 1950 Italian language drama film directed by Pietro Germi

Other
 Speranza (moth), a genus of geometrid moths
 Speranza (festival), an annual youth festival of the Indian Institute of Technology Delhi
 Speranza Motors, a brand used by Chery Automobile
 Speranza Park, the former home of the Toledo Maumees baseball team
 Icaria Speranza, a colony of the Icarians utopian movement
 A character in Edmund Spenser's The Faerie Queene